NCAA Season 79 is the 2003–04 season of the National Collegiate Athletic Association (Philippines), which was hosted by San Sebastian College - Recoletos.

It was the coverage by ABS-CBN Sports aired on Studio 23 for the second consecutive year.

Basketball

Elimination round

Men's playoffs

See also
 UAAP Season 66

2003 in multi-sport events
79
2004 in multi-sport events
2003 in Philippine sport
2004 in Philippine sport